Abiadisaurus is an extinct genus of prehistoric amphibian from the Temnospondyli clade. It is known solely from the Late Triassic Adigrat Sandstone of Ethiopia.

Description
Abiadisaurus is known only from a left jawbone within the collection of the University of California Museum of Paleontology (UCMP 154459 is its designation), first described in 1998.

See also
 Prehistoric amphibian
 List of prehistoric amphibians

References

Temnospondyls
Fossil taxa described in 2001